Chasm (stylized as CHASM) is the 15th studio album by Ryuichi Sakamoto and was released in 2004. The album is experimental, pairing Sakamoto's piano work with ambient and glitch programming. Notably, Sakamoto's former bandmates from Yellow Magic Orchestra, Haruomi Hosono and Yukihiro Takahashi, contribute on several songs under their own production name, Sketch Show.

The song "coro" was featured on the soundtrack to the anime film Appleseed, while "World Citizen - i won't be disappointed/looped piano" and "only love can conquer hate" were featured in the film Babel. The original version of "Ngo", featured on the single for "Undercooled", was used in a New Balance advertisement. "Seven Samurai - ending theme" is taken from Sakamoto's score for the PlayStation 2 game Seven Samurai 20XX.

The US version of the album replaces "the land song" with two pieces, "song" and "word". A single vinyl edition was also released, containing ten of the original fourteen songs.

Track listing

International version

Vinyl version

Personnel
Ryuichi Sakamoto – all piano and keyboards; producer of all songs except "War & Peace"
Sketch Show – sound programming on "Undercooled", "War & Peace", "World Citizen – i won't be disappointed/looped piano" and "Ngo / bitmix"
David Sylvian – vocals and lyrics on both "World Citizen" tracks
Keigo Oyamada – guitar on "Undercooled" and "World Citizen / re-cycled"; CDJ-800 on "World Citizen – i won't be disappointed/looped piano"
Luiz Brasil – guitar on "Undercooled" and "War & Peace"
Amadeo Pace – guitar on "World Citizen – i won't be disappointed/looped piano"
Jaques Morelenbaum – cello on "Undercooled" and "War & Peace"
MC Sniper – vocals on "Undercooled"
Maucha Adnet – vocals on "Ngo / bitmix"
Haruomi Hosono – medicine drum on "War & Peace"
Arto Lindsay – producer of "Undercooled" and "War & Peace"
Ryoji Ikeda – "processing" on "World Citizen / re-cycled"
Marcelo Costa – percussion on "War & Peace"
Cao Xue Jing – erhu on "Undercooled"
Carlos Núñez – whistle on "The Land Song"
Jiang Jian Hua – erhu on "Break With" and "Seven Samurai – ending theme"
Jan Xiao-Qing – gu zheng on "Seven Samurai – ending theme"
Aya Motohashi – hichiriki on "The Land Song" and "Seven Samurai – ending theme"
Dozan Fujiwara – shakuhachi on "Seven Samurai – ending theme"

References

2004 albums
Ryuichi Sakamoto albums
Warner Music Japan albums
Albums produced by Ryuichi Sakamoto